Stenucha is a monotypic moth genus in the subfamily Arctiinae erected by George Hampson in 1901. Its only species, Stenucha dolens, was first described by Herbert Druce in 1897. It is found in Mexico.

References

Arctiini
Monotypic moth genera
Moths of Central America